Montreuil-sur-Thérain (literally Montreuil on Thérain) is a commune in the Oise department in northern France. Montreuil-sur-Thérain station has rail connections to Beauvais and Creil.

See also
 Communes of the Oise department

References

Communes of Oise